The Conejo Valley Unified School District (CVUSD) is a school district in Ventura County, California. The district serves the Conejo Valley area, including the city of Thousand Oaks, the adjacent community of Newbury Park, and the Ventura County portion of Westlake Village.

History
The Conejo Valley Unified School District was established in 1974 from the merger of three school districts covering the Conejo Valley, including two elementary districts and the eastern portion of the Oxnard Union High School District (OUHSD). Thousand Oaks and Newbury Park high schools predate unification, having been built by OUHSD in the 1960s.

Schools

Elementary schools
Acacia Elementary School
Aspen Elementary School
Banyan Elementary School
Conejo Elementary School
Open Classroom Leadership Magnet School
Cypress Elementary School
EARTHS Magnet School
Glenwood Elementary School
Ladera Elementary School
Lang Ranch Elementary School
Madrona Elementary School
Maple Elementary School
Sycamore Canyon Elementary School
Walnut Elementary School
Weathersfield Elementary School
Westlake Elementary School
Westlake Hills Elementary School
Wildwood Elementary School

Middle schools
Colina Middle School
Los Cerritos Middle School
Redwood Middle School
Sequoia Middle School
Century Academy
Sycamore Canyon Middle School

Los Cerritos Middle School
Los Cerritos Middle School (LCMS) was named a Blue Ribbon School in 2004.

In 2010, the Los Cerritos Middle School Jazz Band became the first Ventura County school band to perform at the Midwest Band Clinic, an international band and orchestra conference that is held annually in Chicago. According to school representatives, the invitation is the highest honor a school band can receive.

Sequoia Middle School
Sequoia Middle School was named a California Distinguished School in 2011, the only Ventura County school to be so honored that year.

High schools
Newbury Park High School
Thousand Oaks High School
Westlake High School
Conejo Valley High School
Century Academy

Adult schools
Conejo Valley Adult School

References

External links

 
School districts in Ventura County, California
Education in Thousand Oaks, California
Conejo Valley
Newbury Park, California
1974 establishments in California
School districts established in 1974